Velifer hypselopterus, the sailfin velifer, is an Indo-Pacific velifer.  This species grows to a length of  TL. This species, like the other one in the family Veliferidae, is monotypic in its genus. It is of minor importance in commercial fisheries.

References

 Velifer at the Paleobiology Database
 

Veliferidae
Monotypic fish genera
Taxa named by Pieter Bleeker
Fish described in 1879